Raukokore is a small settlement close to the East Cape in the northeastern North Island of New Zealand. It is located on State Highway 35, close to the mouth of the Raukokore River, 40 kilometres to the west of Hicks Bay.

Raukokore's most notable feature is its Anglican church, Christ Church, a landmark of the East Cape region, which stands isolated close to the shore of Papatea Bay. The church was named as one of the East Cape/Gisborne region's "101 must-do" sites by the New Zealand Automobile Association. The church was designed and built by Duncan Stirling in 1894. Stirling married local Raukokore chief Mihi Kōtukutuku in the church in 1896. The church is listed as a Category 1 Historic Place by Heritage New Zealand.

Raukokore is administered by the Ōpōtiki District Council.

Demographics
The SA1 area is part of the wider Cape Runaway statistical area.

Raukokore had a population of 141 at the 2018 New Zealand census, a decrease of 27 people (−16.1%) since the 2013 census, and a decrease of 9 people (−6.0%) since the 2006 census. There were 66 households, comprising 81 males and 57 females, giving a sex ratio of 1.42 males per female. The median age was 47.9 years (compared with 37.4 years nationally), with 33 people (23.4%) aged under 15 years, 9 (6.4%) aged 15 to 29, 63 (44.7%) aged 30 to 64, and 33 (23.4%) aged 65 or older.

Ethnicities were 38.3% European/Pākehā, 78.7% Māori, and 2.1% Pacific peoples. People may identify with more than one ethnicity.

Although some people chose not to answer the census's question about religious affiliation, 36.2% had no religion, 44.7% were Christian, and 6.4% had Māori religious beliefs.

Of those at least 15 years old, 9 (8.3%) people had a bachelor's or higher degree, and 33 (30.6%) people had no formal qualifications. The median income was $22,800, compared with $31,800 nationally. 9 people (8.3%) earned over $70,000 compared to 17.2% nationally. The employment status of those at least 15 was that 45 (41.7%) people were employed full-time, 18 (16.7%) were part-time, and 9 (8.3%) were unemployed.

Marae

The settlement is in the rohe of the iwi of Te Whānau-ā-Apanui and has two marae affiliated with local hapū. Te Maru o Hinemaka Marae and Pararaki meeting house is affiliated with Te Whānau a Pararaki. Wairūrū Marae and Hinemahuru or Mihi Kōtukutuko meeting house is affiliated with Te Whānau a Maruhaeremuri.

In October 2020, the Government committed $205,700 from the Provincial Growth Fund to develop Wairūrū Marae, creating 8 jobs.

Notable people
 Taika Waititi - Academy Award-winning filmmaker, screenwriter and actor

References

External links
Image of Raukokore Church from TrekEarth site

Ōpōtiki District
Populated places in the Bay of Plenty Region